HD 2421 is a multiple star system in the constellation Andromeda. It is faintly visible to the naked eye with a combined apparent visual magnitude of 5.17. Based on parallax measurements, it is located at a distance of approximately 290 light years from the Sun. The system is drifting further away with a radial velocity of ~2 km/s.

This is a double-lined spectroscopic binary with an orbital period of 3.96 days and an eccentricity of 0.135. The variable radial velocity was first reported by Robert Horace Baker in 1909 and the first orbit computed by Stella Udick in 1912. A refined orbit was published in 1993 resulting in updated orbital parameters, and in the assessment of a period shift with respect to the 1912 observations.

The primary member of the pair, designated component A, has a stellar classification of A2 Vs, indicating a sharp-lined A-type main-sequence star. The element abundances are similar to those in the Sun. The fainter and cooler secondary, component B, is also a sharp-lined star with a class of F2V, matching an F-type main-sequence star.

A steady variation in the motion of the system suggests the influence of a third component. In 2015 a faint companion, component C, was detected  to the southwest of the main pair.

References

A-type main-sequence stars
F-type main-sequence stars
Spectroscopic binaries
Triple stars

Andromeda (constellation)
Durchmusterung objects
002421
002225
0104